Tyrone Booze (born February 12, 1959) is an American retired boxer who held the WBO cruiserweight championship from 1992 to 1993.

Booze became a professional boxer in 1982 and had mixed success during his early career. He had early losses in the 1980s to Evander Holyfield, Eddie Mustafa Muhammad, Johnny DuPlooy, Bert Cooper, Dwight Braxton (to be known as Dwight Muhammad Qawi), and Henry Tillman. In 1990 he lost to Nate Miller for the North American Boxing Federation cruiserweight title by a unanimous decision.

After winning one fight he then challenged Magne Havnaa in 1991 for the WBO cruiserweight title. He lost a twelve-round split decision. When Havnaa relinquished his title, Booze knocked out Derek Angol on July 25, 1992 at G-Mex Centre, Manchester, England to win the vacant WBO title. He defended the belt once, against Ralf Rocchigiani. On February 13, 1993, Markus Bott defeated Booze by a unanimous decision to take the title.

Booze did not fight for a title again and retired in 1998 after losing to Jesse Ferguson.

On September 19, 2011, Tyrone Booze and Super Bowl XXXVII MVP Dexter Jackson began a new radio show called "All Sports" with Randy Harris on Clearwater, Florida's WTAN AM 1340.  The show is also aired on WDCF, WZHR and online on the Talking Sports Network.

On or about September 5, 2022, Tyrone Booze died in Florida. At this time, the cause of death has not been made public.

Professional boxing record

|-
|align="center" colspan="8" | 22 Wins (8 KOs), 12 Losses (2 KOs), 2 Draws, 1 No Contest 
|- align=center
| style="border-style: none none solid solid; background: #e3e3e3" | Result
| style="border-style: none none solid solid; background: #e3e3e3" | Record
| style="border-style: none none solid solid; background: #e3e3e3" | Opponent
| style="border-style: none none solid solid; background: #e3e3e3" | Type
| style="border-style: none none solid solid; background: #e3e3e3" | Round
| style="border-style: none none solid solid; background: #e3e3e3" | Date
| style="border-style: none none solid solid; background: #e3e3e3" | Location
| style="border-style: none none solid solid; background: #e3e3e3" | Notes
|- align=center
| Loss
| 22-12-2
| align=left |  Jesse Ferguson
| 
| 
| 
| align=left | 
| 
|-align=center
| Win
| 22-11-2
| align=left |  Tony Velasco
| 
| 
| 
| align=left |
|
|-align=center
| Win
|21-11-2
| align=left |  James Mullins
| 
| 
| 
| align=left | 
| 
|-align=center
| Win
|20-11-2
| align=left |  Earl Talley
| 
| 
| 
| align=left | 
| 
|-align=center
| Win
| 19-11-2
| align=left |  Jack Jackson
| 
| 
| 
| align=left |
| 
|-align=center
| Win
| 18-11-2
| align=left |  Marc Machain
| 
| 
| 
| align=left | 
| 
|-align=center
| Loss
| 17-11-2
| align=left |  Markus Bott
|
|
|
| align=left | 
| 
|-align=center
| Win
| 17-10-2
| align=left |  Ralf Rocchigiani
| 
| 
| 
| align=left | 
| 
|-align=center
| Win
| 16-10-2
| align=left |  Derek Angol
| 
| 
| 
| align=left |
| 
|-align=center
| Loss
| 15-10-2
| align=left |  Magne Havnå
| 
| 
| 
| align=left |
| 
|-align=center
| Win
| 15-9-2
| align=left |  Ruben Cardona
| 
|
|
| align=left |
| 
|-align=center
| Loss
| 14-9-2
| align=left |  Nate Miller
| 
| 
| 
| align=left | 
| 
|-align=center
| Loss
| 14-8-2
| align=left |  Dwight Muhammad Qawi
| 
| 
| 
| align=left | 
| 
|-align=center
| Win
| 14-7-2
| align=left |  Anthony Witherspoon
|
| 
| 
| align=left | 
| 
|-align=center
| Win
| 13-7-2
| align=left |  Dawud Shaw
| 
|
| 
| align=left | 
| 
|-align=center
| Win
| 12-7-2
| align=left |  Kevin Denson
| 
| 
| 
| align=left |
| 
|-align=center
| NC
|11-7-2
| align=left |  James Holly
| 
|
| 
| align=left |
| 
|-align=center
| Loss
| 11-7-2
| align=left |  Johnny du Plooy
| 
| 
| 
| align=left | 
| 
|-align=center
| Loss
| 11-6-2
| align=left |  Henry Tillman
| 
| 
|
| align=left | 
| 
|-align=center
| Loss
| 11-5-2
| align=left |  Bert Cooper
| 
| 
| 
| align=left | 
|
|-align=center
| Win
| 11-4-2
| align=left |  Pablo Pizzarro
| 
| 
| 
| align=left | 
| 
|-align=center
| Loss
| 10-4-2
| align=left |  Evander Holyfield
|
|
|
| align=left |
| 
|-align=center
| Loss
|10-3-2
| align=left |  Eddie Mustafa Muhammad
|
| 
| 
| align=left | 
|
|-align=center
| Draw
| 10-2-2
| align=left |  Tim Broady
| 
| 
| 
| align=left | 
|
|-align=center
| Win
|10-2-1
| align=left |  Demetrius Edwards
|
|
|
| align=left |
|
|-align=center
| Win
| 9-2-1
| align=left |  Marcus Jackson
|
|
|
| align=left |
| 
|-align=center
| Draw
| 8-2-1
| align=left |  Jerry Halstead
| 
| 
|
| align=left | 
| 
|-align=center
| Win
| 8-2
| align=left |  John Tyrell
| 
| 
|
| align=left | 
| 
|-align=center
| Win
| 7-2
| align=left |  Jose Verdejo
|
|
|
| align=left |
| 
|-align=center
| Loss
| 6-2
| align=left |  Kelvin Kelly
| 
|
|
| align=left | 
| 
|-align=center
| Win
| 6-1
| align=left |  Earl McNeill
|
|
|
| align=left | 
| 
|-align=center
| Win
|5-1
| align=left |  Victor King
|
|
|
| align=left | 
|
|-align=center
| Win
|4-1
| align=left |  Juan Quintana
|
|
|
| align=left | 
| 
|-align=center
| Win
|3-1
| align=left |  Matt Lawrence
| 
| 
| 
| align=left | 
| 
|-align=center
| Loss
|2-1
| align=left |  Muhammad Hakeem
| 
|
|
| align=left | 
|
|-align=center
| Win
|2-0
| align=left |  Robert Folley
|
|
|
| align=left | 
| 
|-align=center
| Win
|1-0
| align=left |  Jimmy Allen
|
|
|
| align=left | 
|
|}

References

External links
 

1959 births
Living people
Boxers from Connecticut
Cruiserweight boxers
World Boxing Organization champions
World cruiserweight boxing champions
Sportspeople from Hartford, Connecticut
American male boxers
African-American boxers
21st-century African-American people
20th-century African-American sportspeople